Sardinia is the second-largest island in the Mediterranean Sea, with a population of about 1.6 million people. The list includes notable natives of Sardinia, as well as those who were born elsewhere but spent a large part of their active life in Sardinia. People of Sardinian heritage and descent are in a separate section of this article.

Academic figures and inventors

 Pietro Amat di San Filippo (1826–1895), geographer, historian and bibliographer
 Giulio Angioni (1939–2016), writer and anthropologist
 Efisio Arru (1927–2000), parasitologist
 Domenico Alberto Azuni (1749–1827), jurist
 Ludovico Baille (1764–1869), historian
 Augusto Bissiri (1879–1968), inventor, credited as one of the first developers of television, the cathode ray tube and the fax
 Remo Bodei (born in Cagliari, 1938), philosopher
 Francesco Antonio Boi (1767–1850), physician and  anatomist
 Francesco Antonio Broccu (1797–1882), inventor, born in Gadoni, regarded as the first developer of the revolver
 Giuseppe Brotzu (1895–1976), pharmacologist, discoverer of cephalosporin based antibiotics, and candidate for Nobel Prize in Medicine.
 Carlo Cercignani (1939–2010), physicist and mathematician
 Fausto Cercignani (born 1941), scholar in linguistics
 Enrico Costa (born 1944), astrophysicist, known for studies on the gamma-ray bursts
 Erminio Costa (Cagliari 1924– Washington 2009),  neuroscientist
 Joan de Girgio Vitelli (Alghero 1870 – Rome 1916), lawyer and writer
 Carlo Fadda (1853–1931), jurist and politician
 Antonio Fais  (1841–1925), mathematician and engineer
 Giovanni Francesco Fara (1543–1591), geographer and historian
 Walter Ferreri, Astronomer
 Gian Luigi Gessa (born 1932), pharmacologist and neuropsychiatrist
 Pier Michele Giagaraccio (16th century AD), jurist, lawyer, and poet
 Paola Leone, neurologist leader researcher of Canavan disease
 Giovanni Lilliu (1914–2012), archeologist, academician, publicist and politician
 Eva Mameli (1886–1978), botanist, naturalist and mathematician
Lidia Mannuzzu (1958–2016) biologist, physiologist and academic
 Antonio Pigliaru  (1922–1969), philosopher
 Salvatore Satta (1902–1975), jurist and writer
 Sebastiano Satta (1867–1914), poet, writer, lawyer and journalist
 Paolo Savona (born 1936), economist
 Giovanni Soro (died 1544), the Western world first great cryptanalyst. Soro was employed in Venice by the Council of Ten as cipher breaker-in-chief.
 Giovanni Spano (1803–1878), linguist and archaeologist
 Nicola Tanda (born 1928) philologist and literary critic
 Pasquale Tola (1800–1874), historian, magistrate and politician

Activists
 Aurelio Chessa (1913–1996)   anarchist, journalist and historian
 Giovanni Nuvoli

Architects and designers

 Paola Antonelli (born 1963), architect, senior Curator in the Department of Architecture and Design at the Museum of Modern Art in New York
 Carlo Battaglia (1933–2005), designer
 Gaetano Cima (1805–1878), Neoclassical architect
 Fernando Clemente (1917–1998), architect and urbanist
 Francesco Boffo (1796–1867), Neoclassical architect
 Davis Ducart architect of the 18th-century
 Renzo Frau (Cagliari 1880 – 1926), designer
 Flavio Manzoni (born 1965), architect and car designer
 Vico Mossa (1914–2003), Architect
 Enzo Satta, urbanist and architect
 Eugenio Tavolara (1901–1963),  sculptor and designer

Authors

Milena Agus (born 1955)
Francesco Alziator (1909–1977), writer and journalist
Antonella Anedda (born  1955), half-Sardinian
Giulio Angioni (born 1939) writer and anthropologist
Gerolamo Araolla (1542–1615)
Sergio Atzeni (1952–1995)
Vicente Bacallar Sanna (1669–1726)
Ludovico Baille (1764–1839)
Alberto Capitta (born 1954)
Fausta Cialente (1898–1994)
Antoni Cossu (1927–2002) 
Grazia Deledda (1871–1936), winner of the Nobel prize for literature
Pietro Delitala (middle 16th century – 1613), poet 
Salvatore Farina (1846–1918), novelist
Maria Chessa Lai (1922–2012), poet
Gavino Ledda (born 1938)
Emilio Lussu (1890–1975)
Francesco Manunta i Baldino (1928–1995), poet
 Rita Carla Francesca Monticelli 
Melchiorre Murenu (1803–1854)
Michela Murgia
Salvatore Niffoi (born 1950), writer
Rafael Sari (1904–1978), poet and writer
Flavio Soriga (born 1975) writer
Pasqual Scanu (1908–1978) 
 Tigellius (1st century BC – 40 BC), lyric poet during the time of Julius Caesar
Pasquale Tola (1800–1874)
 Dolores Turchi (born 1935)

Businessmen

Massimo Cellino (born 1956), entrepreneur and football club owner
Giovanni Antonio Sanna (1819–1875), entrepreneur and politician
Renato Soru (born 1957), entrepreneur founder of Tiscali and former governor of Sardinia
Salvatore Dau (1839–1914), tanner https://commons.wikimedia.org/wiki/File:Salvatore_Dau_1885.jpg

Cinema and TV

Actors and actresses

Gianni Agus
Mavie Bardanzellu (born 1938), actress
Vittorio Congia (1930–2019), film actor
Rubi Dalma (1906–1994)
 Giancarlo Dettori (born 5 April 1932), actor
Maria Frau (born 6 August 1930)
Rossana Ghessa (born 24 January 1943)
Rita Livesi (born 1915)
 Mario Majeroni (1870–1931)
 Gloria Milland (born 1940), actress
Tiberio Murgia
Caterina Murino
Amedeo Nazzari
Alessandro Nivola – American actor, grandson of Costantino Nivola
Marisa Pierangeli
Anna Maria Pierangeli – also known as Pier Angeli

Filmmakers

Luigi Batzella
Antonello Grimaldi
 Piero Livi (1925–2015), director and screenwriter
Nanni Loy
Sebastian Piras, photographer and filmmaker
 Fiorenzo Serra (1921–2005), documentarist 
Franco Solinas (1927–1982) screenwriter

Showgirls and fashion models

Elisabetta Canalis
 Franca Dall'Olio (born 1945), Miss Italia 1963
 Alessandra Meloni (born  1972), Miss Italia 1994
Giorgia Palmas
Melissa Satta

Police officers
Emanuela Loi

Criminals

Er Canaro (born 1956)
Giovanni Corbeddu Salis (1844–1898), outlaw

Journalists

 Francesco Alziator (1909–1977), born in Cagliari
 Pasquale Chessa (born 1947), historian and journalist 
 Attilio Deffenu (1890–1918) journalist, syndicalist and patriot
 Annalisa Piras (born 1971), journalist and film maker
 Cristiano Ruiu (born 1979)

Mercenaries, soldiers and troops

 Mario Aramu (1900–1940), aviator
Domenico Millelire (1761–1827) patriot, navy officer
Antonio Todde (1889–2002),  oldest man in the world at the date of his death and the third-oldest military veteran ever
Efisio Tola (1803–1833), patriot
Justin Tuveri (May 13, 1898 – October 5, 2007), one of the last Italian veterans of the First World War

Musicians and singers

 Giuseppe Anedda (1912–1997) 
Bianca Atzei (born 1987)
Maria Carta
 Collage
Giovanni Matteo De Candia, operatic singer (tenor), known as Mario
Bernardo de Muro, operatic singer (tenor)
Francesco Demuro
Roberto Diana (born 1983)  musician, guitarist, composer, producer and session man
La Fossa (rap group)
Paolo Fresu
Luigi Lai
Raimondo Inconis (born 1959), contrabassoonist
Elena Ledda
Bernadette Manca di Nissa
 Franca Masu (born 1962)
Carmen Melis (1885–1967), operatic soprano
Efisio Melis
Roberto Meloni
 Salmo (rapper)
 Filomena Moretti, guitarist
 Franco Oppo (1935–2016)  composer and scholar
 Aldo Piga,   music compose
Marisa Sannia
Valerio Scanu
 Angelo Sotgiu (born 1946)
Tazenda
Tenores di Bitti

Visual artists

Painters, illustrators, photographers, sculptors

Edina Altara (1898–1983), illustrator and painter
Giuseppe Biasi (1885–1945), painter
Vittore Bocchetta (born 1918), Sculptor, painter and academic
 Carlo Chessa (1855–1912) painter, printmaker, and illustrator
 Francesco Ciusa (1883–1949) sculptor
Ignazio Fresu (born 1957), sculptor
Giovanni del Giglio (died 1554), mannerist painter
Master of Castelsardo (15th–16th century), painter
Francesco Menzio (1899–1979), Painter
Costantino Nivola (1911–1988), sculptor
Aligi Sassu (1912–2000),  sculptor and painter
Pinuccio Sciola (1942–2016), sculptor
Mario Sironi (1885–1961), modernist painter, sculptor, illustrator, and designer
Maria Antonietta Tilloca
Vittoria Valmaggia (1944–2009), painter, ceramist sculptor and designer

Cartoonists and comics creators
Igort (real name Igor Tuveri) (born 1958)
Graziano Origa (born 1952), cartoonist, punk artist
Michele Medda (born 1962), comic writer

Politicians

Giuseppe Abozzi (1882–1962), socialist
Hasan Agha (fl. 1532-1544), ruler of the Regency of Algiers
Camillo Bellieni (1893–1975), politician, founder of Partito Sardo d'Azione
Giovanni Maria Angioy (1751–1808), politician and patriot
Gavino Angius (born 1946), senator
Vicente Bacallar Sanna (1669–1726), governor of Cagliari and Gallura, Spanish ambassador
Benedetta of Cagliari (c. 1194–1232/1233), 
Enrico Berlinguer (1922–1984), Italian Communist Party leader
Giovanni Berlinguer (born 1924), member of the European Parliament
Luigi Berlinguer (born 25 July 1932), Minister of Universities, Science and Technology 
Mario Berlinguer (1891–1969)
Sergio Berlinguer (born 6 May 1934) 
Nanni Campus (born  3 September 1952) 
Francesco Cocco-Ortu (1842 –1929), minister of the Kingdom of Italy
Michele Columbu (born 1914), former member of the European Parliament
Francesco Cossiga (1928–2010), former President of the Italian Republic
Giuseppe Cossiga (born October 30, 1963)
Bruno Dettori (born 1941), politician
Oliviero Diliberto (born 1956), Party of Italian Communists leader
Eleanor of Arborea (1347–1404),  of Arborea
Gianfranco Ganau (born 3 March 1955)
Antonio Gramsci (1891–1937), founding member of the Italian Communist Party
Hugh I of Arborea (1178–1211), giudice of Arborea
Ippolita Ludovisi (1663–1733), princess of Piombino
Emilio Lussu (1890–1975), soldier, politician and writer
Giuseppe Manno (1786–1868), magistrate, politician and historian
Marianus IV of Arborea (1319–1376), giudice of Arborea
Ospitone (6th century AD), chief of people of Barbagia
 Paolo Orano (1875–1945) psychologist, politician and writer
Giuseppe Pisanu (born 1937), former Italian minister
Edmondo Sanjust di Teulada (1858–1936), engineer and politician
Giuseppe Saragat (1898–1988), President of the Italian Republic
 Michele Schirru (1899–1931), anarchist who attempted to assassinate Italian dictator Benito Mussolini
Antonio Segni (1891–1972),  former President of the Italian Republic
Mario Segni (born 1939),  former member of Italian Parliament and European Parliament
Adelasia of Torres (1207–1259),

Sportspeople

Athletics
Sandro Floris (born 1965), former sprinter
Giorgio Marras (born 1971), former sprinter
Eugenio Meloni (born 1994), high jumper
Giovanni Puggioni (born 1966), former sprinter
Antonio Siddi (1923–1983), former sprinter
Filippo Tortu (born 1998), sprinter
Valentina Uccheddu (born 1966), former long jumper

Basketball
Federica Brunetti (born 1988)
Massimo Chessa (born 1988), professional basketball player
Luigi Datome
Lidia Oppo (born 1995)
Daniele Soro (born  1975) 
Marco Spissu (born 1995), professional basketball player

Bodybuilding
Franco Columbu, Mr Olympia in 1976 and 1981, and Mr Universe 1970

Boxing
Fernando Atzori (born 1942), olympic gold medalist
Salvatore Burruni
Enzo Calzaghe
Simone Maludrottu, European bantamweight champion
Gavino Matta
Franco Udella, World Champion

Canoeing
Pierangelo Congiu (born 1951), sprint canoer

Cycling
Fabio Aru (born 1990), Vuelta a España winner
Alberto Loddo (born 1979), retired

Equestrianism

Paolo Angioni (born 1938), olympic champion

Extreme sports
John Carta (1946–1990), skydiver and basejumper pioneer

Football

Simone Aresti (born 1986)
Nicolo Barella (born 1997), Italian international, European champion 2020
Salvatore Burrai (born 1987)
Andrea Cocco (born 1986)
Alessio Cossu (born 1986)
Andrea Cossu (born 1980), former Italian international
Enrico Cotza (born 1988)
Antonello Cuccureddu (born 1949), former Italian international
Alessandro Farina (born 1979)
Gianluca Festa (born 1969)
Michele Fini (born 1974)
Alessandro Frau (born 1977)
Salvatore Fresi (born 1973)
Gustavo Giagnoni (1932–2018)
Nicola Lai (born 1986)
Valentino Lai (born 1984)
Marco Mancosu (born 1988)
Matteo Mancosu (born 1984)
Giuseppe Materazzi (born 1946)
Gianfranco Matteoli (born 1959), former Italian international
Nicola Murru (born 1994)
Salvatore Pinna (born 1975)
Francesco Pisano (born 1986)
Andrea Pisanu (born 1982)
Marco Sau (born 1987), Italian international
Salvatore Sirigu (born 1987), Italian international
Simona Sodini (born 1982), Italian women's international
Giovanni Solinas (born 1968)
Pietro Paolo Virdis (born 1957)
Gianfranco Zola (born 1966), former Italian international

Horse racing
Andrea Atzeni (born 1991)
Giovanni Atzeni (born 1985) 
Andrea Degortes known as Aceto
Gianfranco Dettori

Ice hockey
Luca Sbisa

Modern pentathlon
Mario Medda (1943–1981)

Motor racing
Clemente Biondetti, Formula One racing driver
Domenico Brigaglia (born 1958), motorcycle racer
Omar Magliona (born 1977), racing driver
Giovanni de Riu (1925–2008), racing driver
Simone Sanna (born 1978), motorcycle racer

Rowing
Francesco Cossu (1907–?)

Tennis
Alessandro de Minicis (born 1963), retired

Religious figures

Abraham da Cagliari (8th century AD), Rabbi
Ottorino Pietro Alberti (1927–2012) Archbishop
Salvatore Alepus (1503–1568), Archbishop
Luigi Amat di San Filippo e Sorso (1796–1878), Cardinal
Antiochus of Sulcis (died c. 110 AD), Christian martyr
Hilary the Deacon (mid-4th century) 
Ilario Cao
Nicholas Congiato (1816–1897), Jesuit, President of Santa Clara University
 Justa, Justina and Henedina,  Christian martyrs
Luigi De Magistris, Cardinal
 Giovanni Melis Fois, Prelate of Roman Catholic Church
Saint Ephysius (250–303), Christian martyr
Eusebius of Vercelli
Saint Gabinus (4th century AD), Christian martyr
Pope Hilarius (died 468), Pope
St. Ignatius of Laconi (1701–1781)
Saint Lucifer (4th century AD), Bishop of Cagliari
Antonia Mesina (1919–1935), Martyr
Carlo Mario Francesco Pompedda (1929–2006), Italian cardinal of the Roman Catholic Church and the Prefect of the Apostolic Signatura for the Roman Curia
Riccus (13th century), Archbishop
 Elisabetta Sanna(1788–1857)
Maria Gabriella Sagheddu (1914–1939), Saint Beatus
Pope Symmachus (6th century AD), Pope
Joseph Toronto (1818–1883), Mormon missionary
Aloysius Varsi (1830 -1900)
 Francesco Zirano (1565–1603), member of the Order of Friars Minor, beatified in 2014

Notable people of Sardinian descent

 Ettore Pais (1856–1939), historian with Sardinian ancestry
 Gustavo Piga (born 1964), economist
 Ambra Medda (born 1982), designer
 Orazio Satta Puliga (1910–1974), car designer 
 Italo Calvino (1923–1985), writer candidate for Nobel Prize in Literature with Sardinian ancestry from mother side
 Cecilia Maria de Candia (1853–1926), writer (Sardinian ancestry from father side)
 Goffredo Mameli, patriot and poet, creator of the Italian anthem (born in Genoa by Sardinian father)
 Éric Cantona (born 24 May 1966), French actor and football player with Sardinian ancestry
 Donatella Damiani (born 1958), Sardinian from father side
 Bruce Kirby (1925-2021)), American actor, Sardinian ancestry
 Bruno Kirby (1949–2006), American actor, Sardinian ancestry
 Christopher Meloni, American actor, father from Sardinia
 Fernanda Montenegro (born 1929), Brazilian actress, with Sardinian ancestry from mother's side
 Sean Penn, American actor, Sardinian from mother side
 Bruno Putzulu, French actor, Sardinian ancestry
 Stefano Satta Flores, Sardinian ancestry
 Wally Schirra (1923–2007), astronaut with Sardinian ancestry
 Valeria Marini, born in Rome (Sardinian from mother side)
 Pamela Prati (Sardinian from mother side)
 Virginia Sanjust di Teulada (born 1977), Sardinian from father side
 Adriana Serra (1923–1995), actress and  Miss Italia 1941 (Sardinian from father side)
 Corrado Augias (born 26 January 1935), Sardinian ancestry
 Mino Carta (born 1933), Sardinian parents
 Jean-Marc Morandini (born 1965), Sardinian from mother side
 Barbara Serra (born 1974), Sardinian from father side
 Efisio Tola (1803–1833), patriot

 Ricky Gianco (born Riccardo Sanna, 1943), singer, songwriter, guitarist and record producer, with partial Sardinian ancestry
 Ivan Graziani, Sardinian from mother side
 Nyco Lilliu (born 1987), Sardinian ancestry
 Pierrick Lilliu (born 1986), Sardinian ancestry
 Ugo Mulas (1928–1973), photographer with Sardinian ancestry
 Aurelio Galleppini (1917–1994) (His parents were Sardinians)

 Graziano Delrio (born 1960), Italian Minister of Infrastructure and Transport with Sardinian ancestry
 Beji Caid Essebsi (1926–2019), The first democratically elected President of Tunisia (Paternal great-great-grandfather  from Sardinia) 
 Enrico Letta (born 1966), former Prime Minister of Italy. Sardinian from mother side.
 Jean-Paul Marat (from the father's side) (1743–1793), politician during the French Revolution
 Giorgia Meloni (born 1977), Prime minister of Italy (Sardinian from father side)
 Juan Domingo Perón (1895–1974), President of Argentina (Sardinian descent from father side)
 Silvia Salis (born in Genoa, Sardinian ancestry)
 Luigi Datome (born 1987) professional basketball player with Sardinian ancestry who currently plays for Fenerbahçe Ülker. 
 Joe Calzaghe – father Enzo from Sardinia
 Nicolino Locche (1939–2005), Argentine boxer with Sardinian ancestry
 Duilio Loi – Sardinian from father side
 Graciano Rocchigiani – father Zanubio from Sardinia
 Mattia Aramu (born 1995), Sardinian parents
 Dennis Chessa (born 1992) Sardinian ancestry
 Marco Materazzi – mother from Tempio, father from Arborea, province of Oristano
 Frankie Dettori – born in Milan from Sardinian parents
 Fabio Carta – born in Torino, Sardinian parents
 Andreia Marras (born 1971)  – Sardinian ancestry
 Alessandro Mahmoud (Mahmood) – born in Milan from Sardinian mother

See also
 Sardinian people
 List of Italians

References

Sardinia

Sardinia-related lists
Sardinian
People of Sardinian descent